Hank Mobley Quintet is an album by jazz saxophonist Hank Mobley released on the Blue Note label in 1957 as BLP 1550. It was recorded on March 8, 1957 and features Mobley, trumpeter Art Farmer, bassist Doug Watkins, pianist Horace Silver, and drummer Art Blakey. These musicians were the first lineup of The Jazz Messengers, with Farmer instead of Kenny Dorham. The album was remastered in 2008 by Rudy Van Gelder and issued on CD.

Reception
The Allmusic review by Steve Leggett awarded the album 4.5 stars, stating: "Mobley might not have been out there pushing the envelope with his instrument, but here he plays with confidence and lyrical economy, making this easily one of his best outings."

Track listing 
All compositions by Hank Mobley

 "Funk in Deep Freeze" - 6:50
 "Wham and They're Off" - 7:42	 
 "Fin de l'affaire" - 6:39 	 
 "Startin' from Scratch" - 6:43	 
 "Stella-Wise" - 7:18 	 
 "Base on Balls" - 7:33
Only available on CD edition:
 "Funk in Deep Freeze" (Alternate Take) - 6:57
 "Wham and They're Off" (Alternate Take) - 7:37

Personnel 
 Hank Mobley - tenor saxophone
 Art Farmer - trumpet
 Horace Silver - piano
 Doug Watkins - bass
 Art Blakey - drums

References 

1957 albums
Albums produced by Alfred Lion
Albums recorded at Van Gelder Studio
Blue Note Records albums
Hank Mobley albums
Hard bop albums